Daniel Patrick Horan  (born 1983) is an American Franciscan friar, Catholic priest, theologian, and author. He is currently the Director of the Center for Spirituality and Professor of Philosophy, Religious Studies, and Theology at Saint Mary's College (Indiana) in Notre Dame, Indiana. He previously held the Duns Scotus Chair of Spirituality at Catholic Theological Union in Chicago. He is a columnist for National Catholic Reporter.

Early life and education
Horan was born on November 15, 1983, in Pensacola, Florida. He studied theology (in the School of Arts and Sciences) and journalism (in the Jandoli School of Journalism) at St. Bonaventure University, and studied in the Master of Arts in systematic theology and Master of Divinity programs at the Washington Theological Union. He earned a Doctor of Philosophy degree in systematic theology from Boston College.

Career
Horan taught in the Department of Religious Studies at Siena College in Loudonville, New York, and summer courses in the Department of Theology at St. Bonaventure University, the School of Theology and Ministry at Boston College, and at Catholic Theological Union. He serves on the Board of Trustees of St. Bonaventure University and the Board of Regents of Franciscan School of Theology. He previously served several terms on the International Thomas Merton Society Board of Directors and is a former columnist at America.

Horan has written on Franciscan theology, philosophy, and spirituality as well as given lectures and delivered academic papers (around the United States, Canada, and Europe) on the theological and social significance of the work of Thomas Merton. He has also given workshops and delivered lectures on the intersection of the millennial generation and spirituality. His current work focuses on postmodern thought and the use of medieval Franciscan thinkers like John Duns Scotus as well as the authentic retrieval of their thought for contemporary theological inquiry; the life, work and thought of Thomas Merton; and contemporary systematic and constructive theologies.

Horan is known for leading retreats.

Honours
2011 Catholic Press Association First-Place Award for the article "Digital Natives and Franciscan Spirituality" published in the journal Spiritual Life.
2014 Catholic Press Association Third-Place Award for the book Naked, and You Clothed Me (Contributor).
Honorary Doctor of Humane Letters degree, Felician University (2015)
2020 Association of Catholic Publishers First-Place Award for Best Theology Book Catholicity and Emerging Personhood: A Contemporary Theological Anthropology (Orbis Books, 2019) 
2020 Catholic Press Association First-Place Award for the book Reading, Praying, Living Pope Francis's Rejoice and Be Glad (Liturgical Press, 2019) 
2021 Mackey Award for Catholic Thought, Chaminade University of Honolulu

Books

 (With Julianne Wallace)

 [Spanish trans: Un Nuevo Comienzo: Reflexiones Diarias Para Adviento y Navidad]
 [Spanish trans: Un Nuevo Comienzo: Reflexiones Diarias Para Cuaresma y Pascua]

References

External links 
 
 Los Angeles Religious Education Congress "Fear: The Enemy of Christian Discipleship"
 "Franciscan Authors Book on Dating God" Catholic News Service
 2016 interview with America magazine
 "Faith Seeking Understanding" column for National Catholic Reporter
 The Francis Effect Podcast

1983 births
21st-century American Roman Catholic theologians
21st-century American Roman Catholic priests
American Friars Minor
Boston College School of Theology and Ministry alumni
Catholic Theological Union faculty
Franciscan spirituality
Franciscan theologians
Living people
Scotism
St. Bonaventure University alumni
Washington Theological Union alumni